KBGX (105.3 FM, "Lava 105.3") is a radio station broadcasting a classic hits format. Licensed to Keaau, Hawaii, the station serves the Hilo area. The station is currently owned by Carla Morris and Sally Dobson, through licensee Resoante Hawaii LLC, and features programming from Citadel Media's "The True Oldies Channel" satellite feed.

History
The station went on the air as KBGX on 2004-04-14.

References

External links

BGX
Radio stations established in 2003
Classic hits radio stations in the United States
2003 establishments in Hawaii